Kim Young-ho (born May 27, 1967) is a South Korean actor and singer. Kim was a vocalist for underground rock band Ji-poong-woo in Cheongju in 1988, and performed at the River Music Festival in 1990. He made his musical theatre debut in 1994, and began acting onscreen in 1999. Kim has since appeared in film, television and stage, notably in Club Butterfly (2001), Blue (2003), Night and Day (2008), Portrait of a Beauty (2008) and City of Fathers (2009).

Filmography

Film

Television series

Variety show

Music video

Theater

Discography

Books

Awards and nominations

References

External links 
 
 
 
 

1967 births
Living people
South Korean male film actors
South Korean male television actors
South Korean male stage actors
South Korean male musical theatre actors
South Korean male singers
South Korean rock singers
Cheongju University alumni